Kenanya FIlms is an Indian film production company based in Chennai. The company was founded in 2013 by J Selvakumar. They have produced several Tamil films.

History
The company first produced the film Thirudan Police starring Dinesh, Aishwarya Rajesh, Bala Saravanan, in 2014.

Despite announcing several projects in the late 2010s, the studio has experienced financial problems which has resulted in several of their proposed releases to be indefinitely postponed or shelved. Anand Balki's comedy drama Server Sundaram starring Santhanam began production in late 2015 and was completed in mid-2016, but still remains unreleased. The film has set release dates several times before being pulled due to the studio's financial constraints. Ra. Karthik's directorial debut Vaan was announced in January 2017 but the shoot has been indefinitely put on hold despite a soft launch event in December 2018. Two films starring Ashok Selvan, Prashanth Pandiyaraj's Jack and Swathi's Senorita opposite Wamiqa Gabbi, were also announced but have not progressed.

Filmography

References

External links
 
 
Mass media companies established in 2013
Indian film studios
Film production companies of Tamil Nadu
2013 establishments in Tamil Nadu
Indian companies established in 2013